Koam station is a railway station in Koam-dong, greater Munch'ŏn city, Kangwŏn province, North Korea, on the Munch'ŏn Port Line of the Korean State Railway; the branchline connects to the Kangwŏn Line at Okp'yŏng.

History
Originally called Wŏnsanbukhang station (Chosŏn'gŭl: 원산북항역; Hanja: 元山北港驛, "Wonsan north port station"), it was opened, along with the rest of the branch from Okp'yŏng (at the time called Munch'ŏn station), on 17 December 1943 by the Chosen Anthracite Company as a privately owned railway. This line, like all other railway lines in North Korea, was nationalised after the Second World War, becoming part of the Korean State Railway, subsequently receiving its current name.

References

Railway stations in North Korea
Railway stations opened in 1943